Karsten Just (born 17 September 1968, in Berlin) is a retired East German sprinter. He represented the sports club Berliner TSC.

Achievements

References

External links

1968 births
Living people
German male sprinters
Athletes from Berlin
World Athletics Championships medalists
European Athletics Championships medalists
East German male sprinters
World Athletics Indoor Championships winners